In thermochemistry, an endothermic process is any thermodynamic process with an increase in the enthalpy  (or internal energy ) of the system. In such a process, a closed system usually absorbs thermal energy from its surroundings, which is heat transfer into the system. Thus, an endothermic reaction generally leads to an increase in the temperature of the system and a decrease in that of the surroundings. It may be a chemical process, such as dissolving ammonium nitrate in water, or a physical process, such as the melting of ice cubes.

The term was coined by 19th-century French chemist Marcellin Berthelot. The opposite of an endothermic process is an exothermic process, one that releases or "gives out" energy, usually in the form of heat and sometimes as electrical energy. Thus, in each term (endothermic and exothermic) the prefix refers to where heat (or electrical energy) goes as the process occurs.

In chemistry
Due to bonds breaking and forming during various processes (changes in state, chemical reactions), there is usually a change in energy. If the energy of the forming bonds is greater than the energy of the breaking bonds, then energy is released. This is known as an exothermic reaction. However, if more energy is needed to break the bonds than the energy being released, energy is taken up. Therefore, it is an endothermic reaction.

Details
Whether a process can occur spontaneously depends not only on the enthalpy change but also on the entropy change and absolute temperature . If a process is a spontaneous process at a certain temperature, the products have a lower Gibbs free energy  than the reactants (an exergonic process), even if the enthalpy of the products is higher. Thus, an endothermic process usually requires a favorable entropy increase in the system that overcomes the unfavorable increase in enthalpy so that still . While endothermic phase transitions into more disordered states of higher entropy, e.g. melting and vaporization, are common, spontaneous chemical processes at moderate temperatures are rarely endothermic. An example of an endothermic and exergonic process is

C6H12O6 + 6 H2O -> 12 H2 + 6 CO2
.

Examples

 Evaporation
 Sublimation
 Cracking of alkanes
 Thermal decomposition
 Hydrolysis
 Nucleosynthesis of elements heavier than nickel in stellar cores
 High-energy neutrons can produce tritium from lithium-7 in an endothermic process, consuming 2.466 MeV. This was discovered when the 1954 Castle Bravo nuclear test produced an unexpectedly high yield.
 Nuclear fusion of elements heavier than iron in supernovae
Dissolving together barium hydroxide and ammonium chloride
Dissolving together citric acid and baking soda

Distinction between endothermic and endotherm
The terms "endothermic" and "endotherm" are both derived from Greek   "within" and   "heat", but depending on context, they can have very different meanings.

In physics, thermodynamics applies to processes involving a system and its surroundings, and the term "endothermic" is used to describe a reaction where energy is taken "(with)in" by the system (vs. an "exothermic" reaction, which releases energy "outwards").

In biology, thermoregulation is the ability of an organism to maintain its body temperature, and the term "endotherm" refers to an organism that can do so from "within" by using the heat released by its internal bodily functions (vs. an "ectotherm", which relies on external, environmental heat sources) to maintain an adequate temperature.

References

External links
 Exothermic and Endothermic – MSDS Hyper-Glossary at Interactive Learning Paradigms, Incorporated

Thermochemistry
Thermodynamic processes
Chemical thermodynamics